Jawad Bashir is a Pakistani film and television director, actor, singer, and tarot card reader.

Early life and career
Jawad Bashir was born in Lahore and studied at the National College of Arts (NCA), where he and his friends, mainly in coordination with Director/Special Effects/Musician Ahsan Khan started the classic spoof TV programme 'VJ' (Video Junction) on NTM TV Network. The programme was an instant hit and Jawad later rose to prominence as a sitcom director most of which were shot at NCA. Jawad Bashir was also the member of a music group called Dr. Aur Billa. Jawad Bashir has also been prominent as a video director. Most of his videos are funky with a humorous touch.

Jawad Bashir is widely considered to be the director who brought innovation to TV drama serial industry of Pakistan especially in sitcoms.

Filmography

Films directed 
 Maya (2015)
 Teri Meri Love Story (2016)

Television serials

See also 
 List of Pakistani actors

References

External links 
 

Year of birth missing (living people)
Living people
Pakistani pop singers
Pakistani male television actors
Pakistani television directors
National College of Arts alumni
Pakistani music video directors
VJs (media personalities)
Male actors from Lahore
Singers from Lahore